Jon Chandler Hoffman (born August 17, 1990) is an American professional soccer player who currently plays as a forward for Los Angeles Force in the National Independent Soccer Association.

Career

College and amateur
After leading Oak Mountain High School to two state championships (2007, 2008), Hoffman played college soccer at UCLA between 2009 and 2011. During his time at UCLA, Hoffman was a Hermann Trophy semifinalist, NSCAA Third-team All-American, First-team NSCAA All-Far West selection, First-team All-Pac-12 honoree, Second-team CoSIDA Academic All-American, First-team Academic All-District and Pac-12 All-Academic.

Hoffman also played in the Premier Development League for Panama City Pirates in 2009 and Orange County Blue Star in both 2010 and 2011.

Professional
After his junior season at UCLA, Hoffman was offered a Generation Adidas contract by Major League Soccer which he accepted. He attended the MLS Player Combine, January 6–10, 2012 in Fort Lauderdale, Florida. He then headed to Kansas City, Missouri for the 2012 MLS SuperDraft where he was selected in the 1st Round (13th overall pick) by Philadelphia Union, becoming the first player from Alabama ever selected in the 1st Round of the MLS SuperDraft.

Hoffman made his professional debut on March 31, 2012 when he started for Philadelphia Union in a regular season home game at PPL Park against the Vancouver Whitecaps.

Hoffman was loaned to USL Pro club Harrisburg City Islanders for two matches on April 20–21, 2012.

Hoffman scored the game-winning goal in a friendly on May 9, 2012 vs. the popular European club, FC Schalke 04.

On the eve of the 2013 season, Hoffman was traded to Los Angeles Galaxy for a conditional 2014 MLS SuperDraft pick.

On December 18, 2014, Hoffman was selected by Houston Dynamo in stage two of the 2014 MLS Re-Entry Draft. He signed with the club eight days later.

After his release from Houston, Hoffman joined United Soccer League side Louisville City on December 28, 2015.  In 2016, he led Louisville City in both goals and points.

Hoffman left Louisville at the end of the 2016 USL season.

On November 17, 2016 Hoffman signed with United Soccer League side Real Monarchs.

On July 3, 2020, Hoffman joined Orange County SC on loan for the 2020 season.

On February 19, 2021, Hoffman was signed by the Los Angeles Force of the National Independent Soccer Association.

Career statistics

Club

Honours
MLS Cup: 2014
2017 USL Regular Season Champions: 2017

Individual
Pac-12 Conference:
First-team: 2010, 2011
NSCAA Far West Region:
First-team: 2011
NCAA All-American:
Third-team: 2011
Soccer America All-American:
First-team: 2011
College Soccer News All-American:
Second-team: 2011
USL Premier Development League:
All League First Team: 2011
All Western Conference Team: 2011
USL Pro:
All League First Team: 2014, 2017

References

External links

UCLA Bio

1990 births
Living people
American soccer players
UCLA Bruins men's soccer players
Panama City Beach Pirates players
Orange County Blue Star players
Philadelphia Union players
Penn FC players
LA Galaxy players
LA Galaxy II players
Houston Dynamo FC players
Colorado Springs Switchbacks FC players
Louisville City FC players
Real Monarchs players
Birmingham Legion FC players
Orange County SC players
Los Angeles Force players
Soccer players from Birmingham, Alabama
Philadelphia Union draft picks
USL League Two players
USL Championship players
Major League Soccer players
National Independent Soccer Association players
Association football forwards